Tomasz Antonowicz (born December 4, 1989) is a Polish male acrobatic gymnast.  With partners Jakub Kosowicz, Wojciech Krysiak and Radoslaw Trojan, Antonowicz achieved 6th in the 2014 Acrobatic Gymnastics World Championships. With partners Michal Jarczak, Szymon Rudyk and Maciej Piasecki, Antonowicz achieved 6th in the 2010 Acrobatic Gymnastics World Championships.

References

External links
 

1989 births
Living people
Polish acrobatic gymnasts
Male acrobatic gymnasts